Lintz Green Railway Station was on the Derwent Valley Railway Branch of the North Eastern Railway near Consett, County Durham, England. The railway station opened with the rest of the line on 2 December 1867 and closed to passengers on the 2 November 1953. The line closed completely in 1963 and was dismantled  with the station site becoming part of the Derwent Walk Country Park.

The station was infamous at the time for the unsolved 1911 murder of its stationmaster.

Unsolved murder
On the night of Saturday 7 October 1911 the sixty-year-old stationmaster, George Wilson, was shot when returning home after closing his office at the station. Although he did not die instantly, when questioned, Wilson was unable to say who had shot him.

The motive for the killing was probably robbery as Wilson was in the habit of carrying the day's takings from the booking office to his house, a trip of 50 yards, when he left for the night. On the day in question, however, he had transported the money earlier in the day. Although the murder hunt, still one of the largest in the northeast, involved two hundred officers, no one was convicted of the crime.

The prime suspect was the relief porter Samuel Atkinson who was arraigned at the local magistrates' court for the murder and sent for trial at the assize court in Durham. At the opening of the trial, the local chief constable, William E. Morant, appeared and offered no evidence against Atkinson, who was released.

See also
List of unsolved murders in the United Kingdom

References

External links
Station and line history
Report on the murder
Report on the murder

Unsolved murders in England
Disused railway stations in County Durham
Former North Eastern Railway (UK) stations
Railway stations in Great Britain opened in 1867
Railway stations in Great Britain closed in 1953
1867 establishments in England
1911 in England
1953 disestablishments in England
1911 murders in the United Kingdom